Kloss's emo skink (Emoia klossi) is a species of lizard in the family Scincidae. It is found in Indonesia and Papua New Guinea.

References

Emoia
Reptiles described in 1914
Reptiles of Indonesia
Reptiles of Papua New Guinea
Taxa named by George Albert Boulenger
Skinks of New Guinea